Hiroyuki Iiri (井入 宏之, Iiri Hiroyuki; born July 29, 1969) is a Japanese professional racing driver.

Complete JGTC/Super GT Results 
(key) (Races in bold indicate pole position) (Races in italics indicate fastest lap)

References 

1969 births
Living people
Japanese racing drivers
Super GT drivers
24 Hours of Le Mans drivers